The Proud Silence is a 1925 German silent film directed by Erich Eriksen and starring Colette Brettel, Ernst Winar and Ernst Pittschau.

The film's sets were designed by the art director Max Frick.

Cast
Colette Brettel
Ernst Winar
Ernst Pittschau
Hans Conradi
Karl Elzer
Ernst Pröckl
Else Wasa

References

External links

Films of the Weimar Republic
German silent feature films
Films directed by Erich Eriksen
National Film films
German black-and-white films
1920s German films